The Administration of the Volhynian Counties was a provisional administrative division of the Civil Administration of the Eastern Lands controlled by the Second Polish Republic, that existed from 7 June 1919 to 9 September 1919. Its seat was located in Kowel.

History 
The Administration of the Volhynian Counties was a provisional administrative division, acting as a district of the Civil Administration of the Eastern Lands controlled by the Second Polish Republic. It was established on 7 June 1919, from the area of the Ukrainian SSR, that was occupied by Poland during the Polish–Soviet War. Its seat was located in the town of Kowel (now Kovel, Ukraine), and its area was divided into three counties, which were: Kowel, Łuck, and Włodzimierz. It was incorporated into then-established Volhynian District on 9 September 1919.

Subdivisions 
It was divided into counties. Those were:
Kowel County (seat: Kowel);
Łuck County (seat: Łuck);
Włodzimierz County (seat: Włodzimierz Wołyński).

Citations

Notes

References 

States and territories established in 1919
States and territories disestablished in 1919
1919 establishments in Poland
1919 establishments in Ukraine
1919 disestablishments in Poland
1919 disestablishments in Ukraine
Districts of the civil administrations of the Second Polish Republic
History of Volhynia
Kovel